The Party of Christian Socialists ( or ) is a Christian-socialist party which was founded on February 15, 2018. The party was created when their founder Mykhailo Dobkin left the Opposition Bloc. In the 2019 Ukrainian parliamentary election party members took part on the election list of Opposition Bloc (a party founded in 2019). In the 2019 election this party won 6 single-seat constituencies and its nationwide list won 3.23% of the votes, meaning it did not overcome the 5% election barrier.

References

2018 establishments in Ukraine
Christian socialist organizations
Eastern Orthodox political parties
Eurosceptic parties in Ukraine
Political parties established in 2018
Political parties in Kyiv
Regionalist parties in Ukraine
Russian political parties in Ukraine
Social democratic parties in Ukraine